Josh Joel Savage (born September 28, 1980) is a former American football defensive end. He was signed as an undrafted free agent by the Tampa Bay Buccaneers in 2004. He played college football at Utah.

Savage also played for the Atlanta Falcons, Tennessee Titans, New Orleans Saints, Florida Tuskers and Omaha Nighthawks.

Early years
Savage was a Second-team All-State selection and team captain as a senior at Hillcrest High School (Salt Lake City, Utah), He had 8 sacks as that season. He lettered two years in basketball and football.

College career
Savage was  a three-year starter at defensive end for the Utes, played in 44 career games with 34 starts. He totaled 120 tackles, 20.5 tackles for loss and 12 sacks. In 2003, as senior, named First-team All-Mountain  West after starting all 12 games with 47 tackles, seven tackles for loss, two sacks and nine passes defensed. As junior, was an honorable mention All-conference  selection after starting all 11 games and totaling 29 tackles, 6.5 tackles for loss and six sacks. In 2001, he started 11 games at left end and played in all 12 games and had  36 total tackles, 7 for loss, 4 sacks and 3 pass breakups.  In 
2000 as a redshirt freshman he played in nine games and made 8 total tackles. In 1999, he was a redshirt.

Professional career

Tampa Bay Buccaneers
Savage was signed as an undrafted free agent by the Tampa Bay Buccaneers in 2004. As a rookie, he played in five games for Buccaneers and posted two tackles for season.

Atlanta Falcons
In 2005, he saw action in one game for the Atlanta Falcons and was on the practice squad for 12 games.

Tennessee Titans
In 2006, Savage was claimed off waivers from Falcons on September 3 and played in five games in a reserve role. Posted career-high four tackles with one QB pressure. He was inactive 11 games.

New Orleans Saints
The Saints signed Savage in 2007 and he played in one game. In 2008, he played in three games and recorded 5 tackles. He was released by the Saints on May 19, 2009.

Florida Tuskers
Savage was signed by the Florida Tuskers of the United Football League on September 3, 2009.

References

External links
Utah Utes bio
Just Sports Stats

1980 births
Living people
People from Ozark, Alabama
Players of American football from Alabama
American football defensive ends
Utah Utes football players
Tampa Bay Buccaneers players
Atlanta Falcons players
Tennessee Titans players
New Orleans Saints players
Florida Tuskers players
Omaha Nighthawks players
Sacramento Mountain Lions players